Reinheimen National Park is a national park in Norway that was established in 2006. The park consists of a  continuous protected mountain area. It is located in Møre og Romsdal and Innlandet counties in Norway. The park includes parts of the municipalities of Lesja, Skjåk, Vågå, Lom, Fjord, and Rauma. The park consists of much of the Tafjordfjella mountain range as well as the reindeer habitat in the northern part of the Ottadalen valley.

The park is one of the largest wilderness areas still intact in Western Norway. Much of the original alpine ecosystem, including wild reindeer, wolverines, golden eagles, gyr falcons, and ptarmigans, is still intact. The park is made up of numerous mountains and valleys. The landscape in Reinheimen is extremely varied. In the west, it is very dramatic, with sharply pointed peaks and knife-edge ridges, and rapidly flowing rivers. Towards the east, the terrain is more gently sloping, plateaus occur, valleys are broader and rivers flow more slowly. A number of rivers, such as the Istra, Rauma, Lora, Finna/Skjerva, Valldøla, and Tora/Føysa, have their sources in Reinheimen.

References

Fjord (municipality)
Rauma, Norway
Skjåk
Lom, Norway
Vågå
Lesja
National parks of Norway
Protected areas established in 2006
Protected areas of Innlandet
Protected areas of Møre og Romsdal
Tourist attractions in Innlandet
Tourist attractions in Møre og Romsdal
2006 establishments in Norway